Lissopterus is a genus of ground beetles in the family Carabidae. There are at least two described species in Lissopterus.

Species
These two species belong to the genus Lissopterus:
 Lissopterus hyadesii Fairmaire, 1885  (Argentina, Chile, and the Falkland Islands)
 Lissopterus quadrinotatus G.R.Waterhouse, 1843  (Argentina, Chile, and the Falkland Islands)

References

Migadopinae